The Metropolitan Police Authority (MPA) (2000–2012) was the local police authority responsible for scrutinising and supporting the work of the Metropolitan Police Service, the police force for Greater London (excluding the City of London Police area). The establishment of the MPA in 2000 marked a fundamental change in the policing of London; establishing, for the first time, a local police authority for the metropolis, with the aim of ensuring that the Metropolitan Police Service was democratically accountable.

The MPA had a strategic role and was not responsible for the day-to-day delivery of policing – which continued to be the direct responsibility of the Commissioner of the Metropolitan Police. The MPA worked closely with the MPS and its partners, including London's 32 borough councils, crime and disorder reduction partnerships and other agencies in the criminal justice system. In addition to its general strategic functions, the MPA set and monitored the annual police budget.

It consisted of 23 members: 12 London Assembly members, appointed by the Mayor of London in accordance with the political balance on the Assembly, four magistrates, and seven independents.  The MPA was set up in 2000 as a functional body of the Greater London Authority, by the Greater London Authority Act 1999.  Previously control of the Metropolitan Police had vested entirely in the Home Secretary.

The MPAs ceased to exist on 16 January 2012, when its functions were transferred to the Mayor's Office for Policing and Crime (MOPAC).

Former members
 Kit Malthouse (Chair, London Assembly, Conservative)
 Reshard Auladin OBE (Vice chair, independent)
 John Roberts (independent)
 Tony Arbour (London Assembly, Conservative)
 Jennette Arnold (London Assembly, Labour)
 Victoria Borwick (London Assembly, Conservative)
 James Cleverly (London Assembly, Conservative)
 Dee Doocey (London Assembly, Liberal Democrat)
 Jenny Jones (London Assembly, Green)
 Joanne McCartney (London Assembly, Labour)
 Stephen O'Connell (London Assembly, Conservative)
 Caroline Pidgeon (London Assembly, Liberal Democrat)
 Faith Boardman (independent)
 Christopher Boothman (independent)
 Valerie Brasse (independent)
 Cindy Butts (independent)
 The Lord Harris of Haringey (independent)
 Kirsten Hearn (independent)
 Neil Johnson (independent)
 Clive Lawton (independent)
 Graham Speed (independent)
 Len Duvall (?–2008)
 Deborah Regal (2008–2010)
 Richard Tracey (2008–2010)

References

External links
 Metropolitan Police Authority
 Mayor's Office for Policing and Crime

2000 establishments in England
2012 disestablishments in England
Greater London Authority functional bodies
History of local government in London
Metropolitan Police
Police authorities in England